Zima (Czech and Slovak feminine: Zimová) is a Slavic surname meaning winter. It may refer to

 Alfred Zima (born 1931), Austrian Olympic boxer
 Lukáš Zima (born 1994), Czech football player
 Madeline Zima (born 1985), American actress
 Tomáš Zima (born 1966), Czech scientist
 Vanessa Zima (born 1986), American actress
 Vera Zima (1953–2020), Croatian actress
 Yvonne Zima (born 1989), American actress

See also
 

Czech-language surnames
Slavic-language surnames